Charles Jordan Alewa Amini, also known as CJ Amini, (born 14 April 1992) is a Papua New Guinean cricketer. He is the son of Kune Amini and brother of Chris Amini, who both also represented PNG.

Playing career
Charles led Papua New Guinea's successful campaign in the ICC East Asia-Pacific Under-15 Cricket 8's in 2006/07.

He was part of the squad in the Under-19 Cricket World Cup in Malaysia in 2008, and went on to take eight wickets in the Qualifiers for the Under-19 Cricket World Cup in New Zealand in 2010. Amini made his Twenty20 level for Papua New Guinea in November 2013.

In December 2013, he signed a rookie contract with the Sydney Sixers for the 2013–14 Big Bash League season.

In January 2014, he dismissed Uganda's top five and eventually finished with career best figures of 6 for 19 in 10 overs as Uganda lost 10 for 52 to be all out for 105 in 35.5 overs in ICC Cricket World Cup Qualifiers at Pukekura Park, New Plymouth.

He made his One Day International debut for Papua New Guinea on 8 November 2014 against Hong Kong in Australia. He made his Twenty20 International debut for Papua New Guinea against Ireland in the 2015 ICC World Twenty20 Qualifier tournament on 15 July 2015.

In March 2018, at the 2018 Cricket World Cup Qualifier 9th/10th place playoff against Hong Kong in what was the 4,000th ODI to be played, Amini took 4 wickets for 27 runs. He had also scored 21 runs in Papua New Guinea's innings, earning the player of the match award. This was also Papua New Guinea's final One Day International before losing their ODI status.

In August 2018, he was named as the vice-captain of Papua New Guinea's squad for Group A of the 2018–19 ICC World Twenty20 East Asia-Pacific Qualifier tournament. In March 2019, he was named as the vice-captain of Papua New Guinea's squad for the Regional Finals of the 2018–19 ICC World Twenty20 East Asia-Pacific Qualifier tournament. The following month, he was named vice-captain of Papua New Guinea's squad for the 2019 ICC World Cricket League Division Two tournament in Namibia. He was named as one of the six players to watch during the tournament.

In June 2019, he was selected to represent the Papua New Guinea cricket team in the men's tournament at the 2019 Pacific Games. In September 2019, he was named as the vice-captain of Papua New Guinea's squad for the 2019 ICC T20 World Cup Qualifier tournament in the United Arab Emirates. In August 2021, Amini was named in Papua New Guinea's squad for the 2021 ICC Men's T20 World Cup.

Personal life
Amini hails from a family with deep cricketing roots. His grandfather Brian and father Charles both captained Papua New Guinea's senior side, while his brother Chris was also a Papua New Guinea senior and Under-19 captain.

His mother Kune led the Papua New Guinea women's team as well, and his aunt, Cheryl Amini, also played for the women's national team.

References

1992 births
Papua New Guinean cricketers
Papua New Guinean sportsmen
Living people
People from the National Capital District (Papua New Guinea)
Papua New Guinea One Day International cricketers
Papua New Guinea Twenty20 International cricketers